The Macdonald Tobacco Company (initially called McDonald Brothers and Co.), founded in 1858 by William Christopher Macdonald and his brother Augustine, converted tobacco leaf from southern U.S. suppliers to pipe and chewing tobacco in Montreal. After several acquisitions, it is now known as Japan Tobacco International (JTI), which manages flagship brands such as Benson & Hedges, Camel, Glamour, LD, Mevius, Natural American Spirit, Silk Cut, Sobranie, and Winston.

History 
The Macdonald Tobacco Company was founded in 1858 by William Christopher Macdonald and his brother Augustine. While the use of tobacco products was growing in popularity, the American Civil War afforded the fledgling company an opportunity that brought enormous financial success leading to Macdonald Brothers, emerging the preeminent tobacco company in the field in Canada. Since the northern U.S. faced a tobacco shortage due to the Civil War conflict (tobacco growers were located in the south), MacDonald Tobacco, a Canadian company, bought tobacco leaf from the Southern United States and transported it via ocean cargo vessels to Montreal. MacDonald Tobacco further processed it into a finished product, then selling to the northern U.S. tobacco-starved market.

By the early 1870s, the company acquired over 500 employees. During this period, William Macdonald bought out his brother's stock position.

Deeply proud of his Scottish heritage, William C. Macdonald imprinted a Scottish Lass on the product packaging for nearly a century. Macdonald actually disliked tobacco, and upon his death in 1917, he bequeathed his company to Walter and Howard Stewart, the two sons of company manager David Stewart. Walter Stewart, now president, replaced pipe tobacco with "roll your own" cigarettes. In 1922, packaged cigarette production was added, quickly becoming the mainstay of the business. During the 1960s, David M. Stewart (1920–1984), expanded the business into the manufacturing of cigars.

The Macdonald Tobacco company remained in the Stewart family until 1974 when David M. Stewart sold it to the American tobacco giant R.J. Reynolds Tobacco Company who, in light of the uncertainty created by the Quebec separatist movement, relocated the head office to Toronto, Ontario.  Most of those assets were later purchased by Japan Tobacco.

References

Tobacco companies of Canada
Defunct manufacturing companies of Canada
R. J. Reynolds Tobacco Company
Japan Tobacco
Companies based in Montreal
Centre-Sud